Far Out Space Nuts is a Sid and Marty Krofft children's television series that aired in 1975 for one season, and produced 15 episodes.  It was one of only two Krofft series produced exclusively for CBS (the second being 1984's Pryor's Place). Reruns of the show aired in daily syndication from 1978 to 1985 as part of the "Krofft Superstars" package with six other Krofft series.

Plot
Like most of the Kroffts's productions, the show's opening sequence provides the setup of its fanciful premise: While loading food into various compartments to prepare a rocket for an upcoming mission, Barney instructs Junior to hit the "lunch" button, but Junior mistakenly hits the "launch" button. The rocket blasts off and takes them on various misadventures on alien planets.

Typically, in each episode, their spaceship (a NASA lunar module) would be captured by aliens (one being played by John Carradine, who so impressed Denver with his acting skills during a scene that he was left speechless and missed his cue, requiring another take) and taken to some strange planet, or the spaceship would merely land somewhere. Then, either Barney and Junior, or the ship, would be taken away by the strange creatures on the planet. After some weird mission was carried out, the two astronauts would be reunited with the spaceship and be off on their next mission.

Cast
The show starred Bob Denver as Junior, a grey-haired (Denver was 40 years old at the time) and seemingly dim-witted but uniquely clever NASA maintenance worker, and Chuck McCann as Barney, his plump and grumpy co-worker. Patty Maloney played Honk, their furry little alien friend who made honking sounds out of the horn on the top of her head instead of speaking.

Episodes

References

External links

Episode list at ShareTV.org
Far Out Space Nuts

1970s American children's comedy television series
1970s American comic science fiction television series
1975 American television series debuts
1976 American television series endings
CBS original programming
American children's science fiction television series
American television shows featuring puppetry
Television series by CBS Studios
Television series by Sid and Marty Krofft Television Productions
Television series set on fictional planets
Space adventure television series